Bisu or BISU may refer to:
 Bisu (festival), a festival celebrated in South Canara region in Karnataka and Kerala as New year, India
Bisu (marque), a Chinese automotive brand.
 Beijing International Studies University, a Chinese university in Chaoyang District, Beijing, China
 Bohol Island State University, a public university in the Philippines
 Bes or Bisu, an Egyptian deity
 Bisu, the alias of Kim Taek-Yong (born 1989), professional StarCraft player from South Korea
 Bisu language, a language of the Sino-Tibetan family
 Ingrid Bisu (born 1987), actress and producer